HD 101930 b is an extrasolar planet orbiting the star HD 101930. It has a minimum mass a third of Jupiter's, nearly the same as Saturn's so it is thought to be a gas giant. It orbits the star closer than Mercury, and the orbit is slightly eccentric.

References

External links 
 

Exoplanets discovered in 2005
Giant planets
Centaurus (constellation)
Exoplanets detected by radial velocity

de:HD 101930 b